Anadolubank A.Ş. is a Turkish bank bought in 1997 by HABAŞ Grubu from the Prime Ministry Privatization Administration of Turkey (T.C. Başbakanlık Özelleştirme İdaresi Başkanlığı) Anadolubank currently maintains 106 branches throughout Turkey and has a personnel of total 1,750 employees.

Anadolubank is a bank that provides vehicle loans, housing loans, consumer loans and commercial loans.

Anadolubank A.Ş. has the fully owned subsidiary Anadolubank N.V. in the Netherlands, maintaining 1 branch in Amsterdam.

Anadolubank provides credits for financing small and middle sized companies. The bank is also targeting to handle a genuine service in retail banking through deposit and credit products.

As of 31.12.2015, total assets of Anadolubank is TL 10.9 billion.

Main shareholders of the bank are Habaş Sınai ve Tıbbi Gazlar İstihsal Endüstri A.Ş holding %69,98 and Mehmet Rüştü Başaran %27,32 of aggregate capital. Other shareholders are, Aysel Başaran (%1,16), Erol Altıntuğ (%0,63), Elif Altıntuğ (%0,62), Habaş Endüstri Tesisleri A.Ş. (%0,20) and Fikriye Filiz Haseski (%0,09).

Financial Subsidiaries
 Anadolu Yatırım Menkul Kıymetler A.Ş.
 Anadolubank Nederland N.V.
 Anadolu Faktoring

See also

List of banks
List of banks in Turkey

External links
 
 Anadolubank Human Resources
 Anadolubank Nederland N.V.
 Anadolu Securities
 Anadolu Factoring
 Anadolu Leasing
 Anadolubank Webborsam
 Anadolubank Paritem

References

Banks established in 1997
Banks of Turkey
Companies based in Istanbul